PMMP was a Finnish pop rock band fronted by singers Paula Vesala and Mira Luoti and backed by musicians Mikko Virta, Juho Vehmanen and Heikki Kytölä. The name of the band is often said to be an abbreviation of the sentence "Paulan ja Miran Molemmat Puolet", which can be translated in English as "Both Sides of Paula and Mira". However, in an interview on the Finnish talk show Krisse Show, they stated that the name of the band comes, like ABBA, from the names of 4 of its members: so PMMP is Paula, Mira, Mira, Paula. PMMP's albums were produced by former Thergothon drummer Jori Sjöroos, who also wrote the music for all the songs. The lyrics are written by Paula and Mira. The band is an acclaimed live act.

PMMP first became well known in Finland with the 2003 summer hit Rusketusraidat ("Tan Lines"). They then enjoyed great success with their second album Kovemmat kädet ("Rougher Hands"), which sold gold (double platinum year 2010). An extended version of the album was released in August 2005. Oo siellä jossain mun, a single from the aforementioned album, is PMMP's biggest hit so far in Finland.

In November 2006 PMMP released their third album Leskiäidin tyttäret ("Daughters of a widow mother"), which sold platinum on the day it was released.

They released an album labeled Puuhevonen ("Wooden Horse") with traditional children's songs in 2007, around the time their first children were born. In 2009 they released their fourth rock/pop album Veden varaan ("Overboard") and their fifth album Rakkaudesta ("Of Love"), released in 2012, is considered as their comeback album.

PMMP played their final concert on October 27, 2013, in the sold-out Helsinki Ice Hall.

"Matka jatkuu vaan" – The Journey Continues
In an article titled "Matka jatkuu vaan" in the biggest Finnish newspaper Helsingin Sanomat (17.2.2007), journalist Leena Virtanen attempts to explain how it is that PMMP appeal to both children and adults, concluding that while indeed an energetic pop band PMMP "live within the space between childhood and adulthood", referring to the lifeworlds of both children and adults, carried through with eternal optimism. Virtanen concludes with the words from one of PMMP's best known songs "Matkalaulu" (travel song), which is in fact a song about the band being on the road: "Tämä voi olla koko elämämme ihanin päivä. Ajetaan hiljempaa. Toivon, että matka jatkuu, jatkuu vaan" [This could be the most wonderful day of our whole life. Let's drive slower. I hope the journey goes on, goes on and on..."]

Activism
PMMP has supported Amnesty International's work against the violence towards women. The song Joku raja from the album Leskiäidin tyttäret is named after Amnesty's campaign by the same name.

On 25 May 2013 PMMP was supposed to perform together with two members of the Russian punk band Pussy Riot at the Maailma kylässä (World Village) festival in Helsinki. The members of Pussy Riot had disappeared and PMMP performed without them but supported their cause for human rights in Russia.

Following that event, after 10 years of performing, the group disbanded.

The members of PMMP
Paula Vesala, December 10, 1981 - vocals
Mira Luoti, February 28, 1978 - vocals
Mikko Virta, March 22, 1982 - guitar, backing vocals
Juho Vehmanen, March 31, 1981 - bass guitar, backing vocals, keyboards
Heikki Kytölä, October 14, 1981(?) - drums, percussion, backing vocals

Discography

Albums

Singles
2003: "Rusketusraidat" (#1) Tan Lines
2003: "Niina" (promo only) 
2003: "Joutsenet" (#8)
2005: "Päiväkoti" (#13) Kindergarten
2005: "Oo siellä jossain mun" (promo only)
2005: "Matkalaulu" Journey Song (promo only) 
2005: "Pikkuveli" Little Brother (promo only)
2006: "Henkilökohtaisesti" Face to Face
2006: "Tässä elämä on" Life Is Here (radio only)
2006: "Kiitos" (promo / radio only)
2007: "Joku raja" (#1)
2009: "Viimeinen valitusvirsi" The Last Jeremiad
2009: "Lautturi" Ferryman (promo/radio only) 
2009: "Pariterapiaa" Couple Therapy
2009: "Lapsuus loppui" Childhood Ended (promo/radio only)
2012: "Heliumpallo" Helium Balloon
2012: "Rakkaalleni" To My Love

References

Mira Luoti, Paula Vesala, Hanna Ylönen, Pasi Kostiainen, PMMP. Like (Publishing), 2008. .
http://www.last.fm/music/PMMP?ac=pmmp

External links

Official homepage 

Finnish musical groups